Maghera is a small town at the foot of the Glenshane Pass in County Londonderry, Northern Ireland. Its population was 4,220 in the 2011 Census, increasing from 3,711 in the 2001 Census. It is situated within Mid-Ulster District, as well as the civil parish of Maghera, which it was named after, and the former barony of Loughinsholin.

History
The town dates back at least to the 6th century to the monastery founded by Saint Lurach whose family were possibly evangelised by Saint Patrick. The Annals of Ulster say that the seat of the Cenél nEoghain was at Ráth Luraig in Maghera. Standing upon the site of the monastery, the present day ruins of St. Lurach's Church date back to the 10th century. They include, over a doorway, a relief of the crucifixion, possibly the oldest in Ireland. The crucification lintel is reproduced in the contemporary Catholic church, St Mary's.

The old church and town were burned in the 12th century. Afterwards, Maghera became the seat of the Bishopric of Cinél nEógain with a cathedral church.  In 1246 its bishop, Germanus O'Carolan (Gilla in Choimded Ó Cerbailláin), pleading the remoteness of Maghera, obtained sanction from Pope Innocent IV to have the see transferred to Derry.

As a result of the Plantation of Ulster and of the Rebellion of 1641 which drove out many of the first English families, Maghera and district attracted Scottish settlers. They came into conflict not only with the dispossessed Irish, but as tenants and as Presbyterians also with the land-owning, Church of Ireland, Ascendancy. A result was large-scale emigration to the American colonies (Charles Thomson, recording himself as from Maghera, signed the Declaration of Independence) and, in the 1790s, the organising of the United Irishmen.

Despairing of reform, and determined to make common cause with their Catholic neighbours, on 7 June 1798 the United Irishmen mustered upwards of 5,000 men in Maghera. But the poorly armed host broke up the following morning on news of the rebel defeat at Antrim and the approach of government troops. A Presbyterian church elder, Watty Graham, was executed for his part, and his head was paraded through the town. His minister, John Glendy, was forced into American exile.

On 12 July 1830,  Orange Order and Ribbonmen clashed over demonstrations the Orange Order held in Maghera and Castledawson. Several Catholic homes were burnt by Protestants in the aftermath. Some repair of sectarian relations was achieved by an active tenant right movement, but with tenant purchase of land facilitated by the Land Acts by the end of the century the national question prevailed. Politically the town has remained split between nationalists, now in the majority, and unionists.

The Great Famine of the 1840s and the years that followed, resulted in a since unrecovered loss of population in the surrounding rural districts. In 2003 the Ancient Order of Hibernians erected a headstone to make the "Famine Plot" were local victims were buried.

In the early 20th century, the town itself was relatively prosperous. With its own railway station, an embroidery factory, a busy weekly market and close proximity to Clark's linen mill in Upperlands, it was one of two major towns within Magherafelt Rural District. The town also benefited from post-war advances in education, housing and transport. Separate primary and secondary schools were built for Catholics and Protestants in the 1960s; new housing estates were constructed and motor cars forced a widening of many of the town's narrow streets

Maghera suffered violence during the Troubles. Over the three decade from the end of the 1960s a total of 14 people were killed in or near the village Maghera, half of them members of the security forces and a further two as a result of family membership of the Ulster Defence Regiment. The Provisional Irish Republican Army were responsible for ten of the deaths. Two, including a Sinn Féin councillor, were killed by loyalist paramilitaries.

From what was possibly a low of 879 in 1910 Maghera population has risen in the course of a century to a census figure in 2011 of 4,220. Reflecting European Union employment in local food processing, 213 residents in 2011 did not have English as a first language.

Governance
The town is part of the Mid-Ulster District Council.  It is located within the Carntogher district electoral area (DLE) which contains the areas Lower Glenshane, Swatragh, Tamlaght O'Crilly, Valley and Maghera. In the 2015 district elections, Carntogher DLE elected three Sinn Féin, one SDLP and one DUP representatives to the council.

Churches

 Old St Lurach's Church, a church dating to the 10th century which has one of the oldest depictions of the crucifixion in Ireland.
 St Lurach's Church, which is the site of the local Church of Ireland congregation.
 St Mary's Catholic Church one of two catholic churches in the town.
 Maghera Presbyterian Church, which is a reformed church. The current building dates from at least 1843
 St Patrick's Church, Glen. The older Catholic Church on the outskirts of the town.
 Maghera Elim Church

Demographics

2011 Census
On Census Day (27 March 2011) the usually resident population of Maghera (Magherafelt Lgd) Settlement was 4,220 accounting for 0.23% of the NI total.
 
99.55% were from the white (including Irish Traveller) ethnic group
74.86% belong to or were brought up in the Catholic religion and 22.61% belong to or were brought up in a 'Protestant and Other Christian (including Christian related)' religion
22.56% indicated that they had a British national identity, 48.82% had an Irish national identity and 27.44% had a Northern Irish national identity*.
  
21.23% had some knowledge of Irish
6.46% had some knowledge of Ulster-Scots
5.06% did not have English as their first language.

Transport
Maghera railway station opened on 18 December 1880, shut for passenger traffic on 28 August 1950 and shut altogether on 1 October 1959.

Notable people

1700s
 Charles Thomson (1729–1824), signatory to the U.S. Declaration of Independence, secretary of the Continental Congress.
John Glendy (1755–1832), republican Presbyterian minister, in American exile twice elected to chaplaincies in the U.S. Congress
Adam Clarke (1762–1832), Methodist theologian and bible scholar.
Watty Graham (1768–1798), United Irishman, Colonel of the Maghera National Guard, executed in 1798.
 Henry Cooke (1788–1868), Presbyterian theologian and Moderator.

1800s
 James Johnston Clark (1809–1891), Unionist MP for County Londonderry, born at Largantogher House.
 Robert Hawthorne (1822–1879), Victoria Cross, assault on Delhi, Indian Rebellion of 1857
 William Shiels (1848–1904), Australian colonial politician and 16th Premier of Victoria.
 James Lenox-Conyngham Chichester-Clark (1884–1933), Unionist MP for South Londonderry in the House of Commons of Northern Ireland. 
Helena Concannon (1878–1952) Irish historian, writer, language scholar and Senator.
Louis Joseph Walsh (1880–1942) solicitor, playwright, Sinn Féin politician.

1900s
 Eve Bunting (1928– ), American-based children's author and novelist.
Erwin Gabathuler OBE FRS (1933–2016) particle physicist.
 John Kelly (1936–2007), founder member and a leader of the Provisional Irish Republican Army.
Mickey Moran (1951– ) Gaelic footballer and manager-coach,
Kenny Shiels (1956– ), footballer, Northern Ireland team manager.

Schools
There are three primary schools and one secondary school in Maghera.

Primary schools
 St Mary's Primary School, Glenview
 Maghera Controlled Primary School
 St Patrick's Primary School, Glen

Secondary school
 St. Patrick's College, a co-educational college.

Sport
The local Gaelic football club is Watty Graham's Gaelic Athletic Club.

References

External links

Culture Northern Ireland

 
Towns in County Londonderry
Mid-Ulster District